The Eurovision Dance Contest was an international ballroom dancing competition organised by the European Broadcasting Union (EBU) and the International DanceSport Federation (IDSF). The IDSF credits the existence of the contest to Richard Bunn of RBI network, Geneva, former EBU controller of sport, who convinced the EBU to create the programme.

Format 
The competition consisted of pairs of dancers from each participating country, each pair performing one dance, a freestyle dance in which the cultures of the individual countries could be showcased to the rest of Europe. In addition to being evaluated by a panel of dance experts, the routines were judged by European audiences who cast their vote for their favourite couple via telephone or text messaging to determine winner of the competition. The BBC was "host broadcaster" for the first two contests in 2007 and 2008, the only contests to date.

Contest history

2007

Eurovision Dance Contest 2007 was hosted in London, United Kingdom. In EDC 2007 each couple has performed two 1 minute 30 seconds dances: the first dance was a ballroom or Latin dance while the second was a freestyle dance. Professional dance couples were allowed to enter the competition. Finland won the competition.

2008

Several changes were introduced for Eurovision Dance Contest 2008 which was hosted in Glasgow, United Kingdom. Professional dance couples were no longer allowed, all pairs had to include one professional and one celebrity dancer. Only one, 2 minute dance, was performed by each couple. A professional jury was introduced to the competition having approximate weight of 20% of the outcome, while the remaining 80% came from televoting. Poland won the competition.

Cancellation
The cancelled third Eurovision Dance Contest was originally planned to be organised in Baku, Azerbaijan at the Heydar Aliyev Sports and Exhibition Complex on 26 September 2009. Host broadcaster İctimai Television was planning to increase the number of participating countries as well as inviting a world-famous star to host the contest, listing Jennifer Lopez, Kylie Minogue and Shakira as candidates. An additional extravaganza open-air concert was planned to be held, bringing together ex-participants of the Eurovision, Junior Eurovision and Eurovision Dance contests on one stage.

On 28 May 2009, the EBU announced that the contest was postponed at least until autumn 2010 as "the number of broadcasters that signed up for participation had not reach the desired level". According to contest coordinator on behalf of EBU Tal Barnea, "concrete plans for a 2010 autumn event were being developed, with considerable changes to introduce a new programme proposal". These plans were expected to be unveiled in the autumn of 2009. The EBU also praised "the commendable work on the next Eurovision Dance Contest already completed by our partners Ictimai Television and the Azerbaijani officials" stating that 2010 edition of the contest was planned to take place in Baku, Azerbaijan as well. In January 2010, EBU Eurovision coordinator, Svante Stockselius, announced that contest had been postponed again, and is now unlikely to happen at all, at least within the next couple of years. He explained this decision was the fact that the popularity of televised dance shows had calmed down recently. In October 2020, it was revealed that Polish broadcaster TVP submitted an unsuccessful bid to host the third edition of the contest at their headquarters in Warsaw.

Participation 

When the competition was first planned, the aim was to begin with ten to twelve participating countries and expand in subsequent years. However, the response rate was greater than anticipated and it proved difficult to turn away the additional countries interested in participating in the event. For logistical reasons, a limitation on number of participants was established. In order to ensure the event was a success, the EBU invited participating broadcasters from member countries to take part. In several countries, where the EBU had more than one member, two broadcasters expressed interest. The final decision of which broadcaster would represent those countries was decided by either an internal accord by the two broadcasters, or by a draw, conducted by the EBU.

Sixteen countries; Austria, Denmark, Finland, Germany, Greece, Ireland, Lithuania, the Netherlands, Poland, Portugal, Russia, Spain, Sweden, Switzerland, Ukraine and the host country the United Kingdom all débuted in the very first Eurovision Dance Contest in 2007. The Croatian broadcaster HRT had expressed an interest in taking part, but did not appear on the final list of participants. In June 2008, Switzerland announced their withdrawal from the 2008 contest without specifying a reason, while Germany withdrew from the 2008 event the same month, due to comparatively low ratings for the 2007 contest in the country. Spain was originally due to take part in 2008, but withdrew in late August 2008 just days before the event, reportedly due to a scheduling clash with the country competing in a qualifying match for the 2010 FIFA World Cup, which was taking place the same evening. In accordance with the rules, Spanish broadcaster TVE were obliged to broadcast the contest live due to their late withdrawal as an active participant. After Switzerland announced their non-participation, and with the format change meaning each couple would dance one one minute and forty five seconds dance each, new countries became eligible to join the event. Azerbaijan were the only country to join that year, but negotiations had taken place with broadcasters from Belarus and Cyprus.

Belarus intended on competing for the first time in 2009 but the contest was cancelled. Although the 2009 contest never happened, Austria, Finland, Lithuania, Sweden and the Netherlands had confirmed they would not compete in the third contest.

Hosting
Most of the expense of the contest is covered by commercial sponsors and contributions from the other participating nations. The contest is considered to be a unique opportunity for promoting the host country as a tourist destination. The table below shows a list of cities and venues that have hosted Eurovision Dance Contest, one or more times.

Winners 

The contest differs from the Eurovision Song Contest in that the winning country does not automatically become host for the next contest. The Eurovision Dance Contest followed the same host selection process as the Junior Eurovision Song Contest.

Top three placings

See also 

 Eurovision Choir
 Eurovision Magic Circus Show
 Eurovision Song Contest
 Eurovision Young Dancers
 Eurovision Young Musicians
 Junior Eurovision Song Contest

References

External links 

 Official Eurovision Dance Contest website
 EBU Press Release
 International DanceSport Federation official website

 
Dance competition television shows
Dance
Recurring events established in 2007
Recurring events disestablished in 2009